The China women's national under-20 volleyball team represents China in women's under-20 volleyball events, it is controlled and managed by the Chinese Volleyball Association that is a member of Asian volleyball body Asian Volleyball Confederation (AVC) and the international volleyball body government the Fédération Internationale de Volleyball (FIVB).

Results

FIVB U20 World Championship
 Champions   Runners up   Third place   Fourth place

Team

Current squad

The following is the Chinese roster in the 2017 FIVB Volleyball Women's U20 World Championship.

Head Coach: Shen Mang

Notable players
 Zhu Ting (2011–2012)
 Yang Hanyu (2016–2017)

References

External links
Official website
FIVB profile

Volleyball
National women's under-20 volleyball teams
Volleyball in China